The Zone 4 of Milan (in Italian: Zona 4 di Milano) is one of the 9 administrative zones of Milan, Italy. It lies in the south-eastern area of the city.

Subdivision
The zone includes the following quarters: Acquabella, Calvairate, Castagnedo, Cavriano, Forlanini, Gamboloita, La Trecca, Monluè, Morsenchio, Nosedo, Omero, Ponte Lambro, Porta Vittoria, Porta Romana, Rogoredo, San Luigi, Santa Giulia, Taliedo and Triulzo Superiore.

Notable places
Milano Rogoredo railway station
Alessandrini Park
Forlanini Park

References

External links

 Zone 4 of Milan (municipal website)

Zones of Milan